Legislative elections were held in Indonesia on 9 April 2014 to elect 136 members of the Regional Representative Council (DPD), 560 members of the People's Representative Council (DPR) and members of regional assemblies at the provincial and regency/municipality level. For eligible voters residing outside Indonesia, elections were held on 5 or 6 April 2014 based on the decision of the electoral commission of each different countries.

Seats up for election

Parties contesting the elections
A total of 46 parties registered to take part in the election nationwide, from which only 12 parties (plus 3 Aceh parties) passed the requirements set by the General Elections Commission (KPU). To contest the elections, all parties had to have
 A branch office and branch in every province
 A branch office and branch in at least 75% of the regencies or municipalities in every province
 A branch (but not necessarily a permanent office) in at least 50% of the districts in every regency or municipality
 At least 1,000 registered members

In addition, at least one-third of each party's candidates had to be female.

Initially, all parties with seats in the DPR were to be allowed to contest the election without the need for verification, but on 29 August 2012, Indonesia's Constitutional Court overturned this provision, obliging all parties to undergo the process.

The results were instrumental to the presidential election in July. The requirement for a presidential ticket had to be supported by a party or a coalition of parties winning at least 20% of the seats or 25% of the popular votes in the legislative election.

The 12 national and three Aceh parties together with their ballot numbers were:

 National Democratic Party (Partai Nasional Demokrat, Nasdem)
 National Awakening Party (Partai Kebangkitan Bangsa, PKB)
 Prosperous Justice Party (Partai Keadilan Sejahtera, PKS)
 Indonesian Democratic Party – Struggle (Partai Demokrasi Indonesia Perjuangan, PDI–P)
 Golkar Party (Partai Golongan Karya)
 Great Indonesia Movement Party (Partai Gerakan Indonesia Raya, Gerindra)
 Democratic Party (Partai Demokrat, PD)
 National Mandate Party (Partai Amanat Nasional, PAN)
 United Development Party (Partai Persatuan Pembangunan, PPP)
 People's Conscience Party (Partai Hati Nurani Rakyat, Hanura)
 Aceh Peace Party (Partai Damai Aceh, PDA)
 Aceh National Party (Partai Nasional Aceh, PNA)
 Aceh Party (Partai Aceh, PA)
 Crescent Star Party (Partai Bulan Bintang, PBB)
 Indonesian Justice and Unity Party (Partai Keadilan dan Persatuan Indonesia, PKPI)

Election schedule

The schedule for the elections, as determined by the Indonesian General Elections Commission is as follows:

Electoral system
On polling day, voters were given four ballot papers, one each for the national People's Representative Council (DPR) and Regional Representative Council (DPD) and one each for their local provincial and regency/municipality Regional Representative Councils (DPRD I and DPRD II). Candidates for the DPR and DPRDI/II stand on a party platform. The ballot papers had a section for each of the parties with the party number and symbol. Under the symbols, that parties candidates were listed. Voters could vote for just the party, or one of the candidates (or both) by punching a hole in the ballot paper with the tool provided. Candidates for the DPD stood on an individual basis, so voters need to punch a hole in the candidate's picture, ballot number or name.

Allocation of seats
For the DPR election, each province was divided into between one and eleven electoral districts depending on population. Each of these electoral districts elected between three and ten members by proportional representation with a 3.5% national threshold.

Once the votes were counted, the General Elections Commission eliminated any party that had failed to obtain a 3.5% share of the national vote. It then allocated seats in the DPR via a two-stage process. First, the number of votes to secure one DPR seat in each electoral district was calculated by dividing the number of valid votes by the number of seats to be elected in each district. Each party's vote in each district was divided by this amount to determine the number of seats won outright. Any party with less than this amount won no seats in this first stage. The remaining votes were then used to determine which party won any seats so far unallocated by awarding these seats to the parties with the largest remainders until all seats were allocated.

For the DPD, each province returns four members regardless of size and population. The candidates for DPD stood independently. Voters were given one and only one vote. The system used is the Single Non-Transferable Vote.

Only parties with at least 25% of the popular vote or that control 20% of seats in the DPR were able to nominate candidates for the presidential election. Parties that did not achieve this percentage had to form a coalition with other parties to make up the required percentage share to nominate a candidate.

Opinion polls
Numerous opinion polls have been done by many different pollsters to gauge the voting intention of the electorate. However, many of them are regarded to be unreliable. The quality of polling in Indonesia varies considerably. Further, some of the polling institutions provide little information about their polling methods. Therefore, the data set out below should be treated with care.

Results

Indonesian Democratic Party – Struggle won the highest vote share, with 18.95% of votes, followed by Golkar with 14.75%and the Great Indonesia Movement Party with 11.81%. However, none of the parties were able to nominate their own presidential candidate for the 2014 Indonesian presidential election because none of them reached the 20% electoral threshold.

By province

Gallery

References

Indonesia
Legislative elections in Indonesia
2014 elections in Indonesia